Lordz of Brooklyn (short L.O.B.), also known as The Lordz is an American crossover hip hop/rock group composed of brothers and childhood friends of mostly Irish American and Italian American descent from the Bay Ridge and Bensonhurst neighborhoods of Brooklyn, New York. The original line up consisted of the McLeer brothers, ADM (previously Ad Money, born Adam McLeer) and MC Kaves (Michael McLeer, born 1969), with Scotty Edge, Dino Cerillo (a.k.a. Dino Bottz) and Paulie Nugent (a.k.a. Paulie 2Times). The Lordz of Brooklyn crew evolved from an earlier rap / graffiti crew called Verrazano Boyz. Graffiti features prominently in their music in songs like Tales From The Rails, Bomb The System, and Out Ta Bomb.

Throughout their career, the Lordz of Brooklyn have collaborated with many artists, including Run-DMC, Everlast, Bumpy Knuckles, Liroy, Busta Rhymes ("Forget Bout It Bout It"), Ozzy Osbourne (Busta Rhyme's "Iron Man" cover), Tim Armstrong ("Outlaw"), KoRn ("White Trash" remix), Shanti ("Momma's Boy" new version), Danny Diablo ("PSK What Does It Mean" Schooly D cover) and others. The group briefly collaborated with the rap supergroup La Coka Nostra.

Biography

1992-1997
The group was initially formed in 1992. Signed to American Recordings/Ventrue, Lordz debuted with All in the Family in 1995. It contained the underground hit single "Saturday Nite Fever", based on a sample of Guess Who's "American Woman". The video to this song has the rare distinction of having been featured twice on separate episodes of Beavis and Butt-Head.

On June 7, 1994, Donna and Michele Blanchard, the mother and sister of ADM and Kaves aged 43 and 4 respectively, died from a hit-and-run in Brooklyn. It remains unsolved to this day. Kaves described his mother as a hippie who encouraged him and his brother to pursue their interest in hip hop. The McLeer brothers are of mixed Italian, Russian, Irish, English, and Scottish descent.

While touring with House of Pain in mid 90s, the group befriended Everlast with whom they recorded "Gravesend (Lake of Fire)" and some exclusive songs on their own for the 1997 indie film Gravesend. The song itself was remixed by Marshall Goodman from Sublime/Long Beach Dub Allstars fame, for Marshall Arts Music (MVP Version) and by Lord Finesse who added verses by himself and O.C., but cut Everlast's verse. A second Lord Finesse remix was made and added new verses by Everlast and Lordz of Brooklyn, both versions, however, were only available on a promotional single. The edit was used in the end credits music for the video game Mafia.

2000-2005
The Lord Finesse short remix was not released to the public until the Lordz of Brooklyn next release, the 2000 vinyl EP The Lordz of Brooklyn Meet Bumpy Knuckles, released on their own and distributed through Landspeed since Island Records purchased American Recordings and Venture got closed. The three track EP also featured a song with Ozzy Osbourne sampled in the chorus and a song with Freddie Foxxx a.k.a. Bumpy Knuckles and IP a.k.a. Ice Pirate, Called Left Behind.

2000 also saw the release of the Lordz of Brooklyn cover version of Run-DMC's hip hop classic "Sucker M.C.'s" on the tribute album Take A Bite Outta Rhyme: A Rock Tribute to Rap. Their version featured Stoned Soul and Everlast and is reportedly Run's favorite Run-DMC cover.

The group's next album release, Graffiti Roc, was rather a compilation of various previously recorded tracks than a proper studio album, and followed in 2003. It featured Busta Rhymes, Korn, Rampage of the Flipmode Squad, and others. Now, the groups' style leaned towards a crossover sound of both hip hop and rock influences. By that time, Scotty Edge, Dino Bottz and Paulie 2Times have already left, and the McLeer brothers added live musicians on guitar (Patrick Saccenti), bass and drums to tour festivals such as Vans Warped Tour in 2003, 2004 and 2005.

2006–present
In 2006 the group shortened their name for the release of the third album The Brooklyn Way. Featured artists are longtime collaborator Everlast, Bedouin Soundclash, Jaret Reddick of Bowling for Soup and Tim Armstrong of Rancid. But not only the name has changed, the group's sound changed as well, there are only very few, if any, hip hop references. The majority of the songs are now rock-driven.

In 2007, Scotty Edge rejoined the group for their spring tour with Fishbone.

In April 2008, The Lordz had their own reality TV show on Fuse entitled "The Brooklyn Way" which focused on the McLeer brothers' life and times since before 2006. Later that year, they were playing all dates of the 2008 Vans Warped Tour and were also touring the US with Everlast.

Since 2018, they have returned to their Hip-Hop origins, started to use the full name "Lordz Of Brooklyn" again and in 2020 released a new album Family Reunion.

Musical style and influences
Lordz influences include rock and metal artists such as Metallica, Led Zeppelin and Mötley Crüe, hip hop artists such as Beastie Boys, Run-DMC and Public Enemy, classic Italian-American musicians such as Frank Sinatra, Dean Martin and Tony Bennett, and classic Italian-American New York-based movies such as Goodfellas, A Bronx Tale and Saturday Night Fever.

Discography 
 All in the Family (1995)
 Graffiti Roc (2003)
 The Brooklyn Way (2006)
 Family Reunion (2020)

References

External links
lordzofbrooklyn.com original website
Lordz of Brooklyn at MySpace

Bay Ridge
Bensonhurst
Irish-American culture in New York City
Italian-American culture in New York City
Hip hop groups from New York City
Rock music groups from New York (state)
Musical groups established in 1992
Musical groups from Brooklyn
Warner Records artists
Rappers from Brooklyn
Underground rappers